Richard Bathoe Jones (8 September 1830 – 15 October 1916) was an Anglican priest in Ireland.

He was born in County Cork and  educated at Trinity College, Dublin. He held curacies at Broadford, O'Brien's Bridge and Killaloe; and incumbencies at  Sixmilebridge, Templeharry, Ballymackey and Roscrea. He was Archdeacon of Killaloe from 1888.

References

Alumni of Trinity College Dublin
19th-century Irish Anglican priests
Archdeacons of Killaloe
People from County Cork
1830 births
1916 deaths